John S. Stonebraker (April 25, 1918 – January 25, 2000) was a player in the National Football League. He played with the Green Bay Packers during the 1942 NFL season.

References

People from Frankfort, Indiana
Green Bay Packers players
USC Trojans football players
1918 births
2000 deaths